Estefanía Villarreal (born Estefanía Villarreal Villarreal; March 11, 1987) is a Mexican actress best known for her performance in the Mexican telenovela Rebelde as Celina Ferrer.

While working on Rebelde, she and two other co-stars formed the band Citrus or c3Q's, which released the song "No Me Importa" ("I Don't Care").

Television roles

References

External links
 

1987 births
Living people
Actresses from Monterrey
Mexican telenovela actresses
Mexican television actresses